The European Movement - Belgium (EMB) is the Belgian branch of the International European Movement. As a non-profit association, open to all individuals and organisations supporting European integration, the EMB works for the promotion of a united Europe, closer to its citizens. In this context, it tries to inform and call on Europe and to contribute to the development of a European consciousness. Supported by its members, the EMB is independent and autonomous, with headquarters in Brussels.

History 
 
The Belgian Council of the European Movement, founded in 1949, has played an important role in European integration, especially under the inspiration of presidents like Paul-Henri Spaak and Jean Rey, respectively Chairman of the Parliamentary Assembly of the ECSC and of the European Commission. 

A difficult financial situation and the European Parliament elections by universal suffrage in 1979 (which was, for some, an ideal link between the Community and its citizens) led the Belgian scuttling. 
The association was then dissolved when the European idea had progressed and its function of encouraging the Belgian authorities to adopt a pro-European stance was less necessary. 

In 1992, in the wake of Danish and French referendums on the Maastricht Treaty, and in opposition to Eurosceptics who portrayed Europe as the cause of all evils, some political figures such Willy De Clercq, have revived the European Movement – Belgium. Because of a widening gap between European integration and public opinion, its action has become absolutely relevant and necessary.

Activities 
 
To achieve its objectives, the EMB organizes a diversified program and activities accessible to a wide audience annually through Belgium: 
 Cultural evenings on member and candidate states to the EU,
 A Brussels Capital of Europe rally
 Public debates with Belgian and European personalities
 Radio broadcasts
 Exhibitions
 Interactive animations during Europe Day
 Open weekends at Val-Duchesse to commemorate the 50th anniversary of the Treaty of Rome (20,000 visitors)

In partnership with the youth committee and Young European Federalists – Belgium, the EMB has also introduced a range of activities for young people: 
 training weekends on Europe
 visit to European institutions in Brussels, Strasbourg and Luxembourg,
 Interschool debates,
 Interactive lessons on current events,
 Seminars.

The European Movement – Belgium finally participates in the activities of the European Movement International.

Structure 
 
The European Movement – Belgium is one of 41 national councils of the European Movement International. It is composed of a General Assembly, a Bureau and a Board of Governors, which meets every two months. 
The EMB is currently chaired by Olivier Hinnekens, successor to the post at Anne Van Lancker former MEP (Socialist Group) and Charles-Ferdinand Nothomb, Belgian Minister of State. 

Office 2014 - : 
 President: Olivier Hinnekens
 Vice-President (NL): Lin Vanwaeyenbergh
 Vice-President (FR): Patrick Vandenbossche
 General Secretary: Patrick Vandenbossche
 Treasurer: Dominique Ostyn

References

External links 
  Official website of EMB
 Official website of the International European Movement
 of the European Movement on the website of the European Navigator
Europe United

Political organisations based in Belgium
Lobbying organizations in Europe
Pro-Europeanism